Joey Lauren Adams (born January 9, 1968) is an American actress and director. Adams starred in Chasing Amy, for which she was nominated for the Golden Globe Award for Best Actress – Motion Picture Musical or Comedy, and played smaller roles in other Kevin Smith View Askewniverse films.

Career
Adams began her film career in 1977 with a small role in Exorcist II: The Heretic. From there she began to find larger roles. In 1991, Adams appeared in "Top of the Heap", the 100th episode of Married... with Children, and subsequently starred in its short-lived spinoff. In 1993, Adams landed her first major film role as Simone in Richard Linklater's Dazed and Confused. The same year, she appeared in the Saturday Night Live spinoff film Coneheads as one of Connie Conehead's friends. 
  
Two years later, Adams appeared in Mallrats, written and directed by Kevin Smith. The two started dating during the film's post-production, and their relationship provided the inspiration for Smith's next film, Chasing Amy. The relationship did not last long, but ended on friendly terms. Meanwhile, in 1996, while Smith was finalizing the script for Chasing Amy, Adams was cast in the slapstick comedy Bio-Dome, which was directed by Jason Bloom. Adams played Monique, Bud Macintosh's (Pauly Shore) girlfriend.

Adams played a leading role in 1997's Chasing Amy, portraying Alyssa Jones, a lesbian who falls in love with a man, played by Ben Affleck. Later, Smith would describe Chasing Amy as a "sort of penance/valentine" and a "thank-you homage" to Adams. In addition to her acting work on the film, Adams wrote and performed the song "Alive" for the film's soundtrack.

Adams' performance in Chasing Amy earned her both the 1997 Chicago Film Critics Award and Las Vegas Film Critics Society Award for Most Promising Actress, and a Golden Globe nomination for Best Actress-Motion Picture Musical or Comedy. From there, Adams was originally slated to play the female lead in Smith's next film, 1999's Dogma, but Linda Fiorentino ultimately won the role. However, she would later make brief appearances in two other Smith projects: the 2001 film Jay and Silent Bob Strike Back, and the 2004 animated short Clerks: The Lost Scene, featured on the Clerks X DVD. In both of these appearances, Adams reprises the role of Alyssa Jones.

Her post-Smith projects included playing a spunky veterinarian's assistant who falls in love with a single father (Vince Vaughn) in 1998's A Cool, Dry Place. The following year, Adams appeared in her first big-budget Hollywood release, playing Adam Sandler's love interest in the successful comedy Big Daddy. She then went on to appear in many smaller films, including Beautiful and In the Shadows. In 2005, she had a guest role in an episode of the TV series Veronica Mars. 

Also in 2006, Adams released her directorial debut film, Come Early Morning, starring Ashley Judd, Jeffrey Donovan, Diane Ladd, Tim Blake Nelson and Laura Prepon. The film, shot on location in Little Rock, Arkansas, was selected for the 2006 Sundance Film Festival.

In 2006, she, along with Lian Lunson and Nicole Holofcener, was awarded the Women in Film Dorothy Arzner Directors Award. On November 24, 2009, Interscope Records released Adams' directorial debut for a music video entitled "Belle of the Boulevard" by Dashboard Confessional.

Adams returned to TV in March 2010, on the Showtime series The United States of Tara. She appeared in six episodes as Pammy, a barmaid who falls for Buck, one of the title character's alternate personalities.

Adams is also known for her distinctive voice which one film critic referred to as that of a "sex-kitten-on-helium". Regarding her voice, Adams commented: "It's not a normal voice. It doesn't fit into people's preconceptions about what a woman's voice should sound like. My mom doesn't think I have an unusual voice, though. I'm sure it's helped me get some roles. But Chasing Amy I almost didn't get. There was concern the voice would grate on some people, which some critics said it did." Another film critic said that whether viewers loved it or hated it, her voice had "the potential to hypnotize."

Personal life
Adams was born in North Little Rock, Arkansas, the youngest of three children. Her father was a lumber yard owner. Adams grew up in the Overbrook neighborhood of North Little Rock and graduated from North Little Rock Northeast High School in 1986. She announced her intention to pursue acting after one year as an exchange student in Australia. In a May 7, 1997, appearance on The Tonight Show with Jay Leno to promote Chasing Amy, Adams revealed she was a niece to Hee-Haw cast member and ordained minister Grady Nutt.

Adams married Brian Vilim in 2014.

Filmography

Film

Television

References

External links
 
 

1968 births
20th-century American actresses
21st-century American actresses
Actresses from Little Rock, Arkansas
American film actresses
American television actresses
American voice actresses
Living people
People from Sherwood, Arkansas
Actresses from Arkansas